Sakura Samurai may refer to:

 Sakura Samurai: Art of the Sword, a 2011 video game
 Sakura Samurai (group), a group of white hat hackers